Chukanov is a Russian masculine surname, its feminine counterpart is Chukanova. It may refer to
Anatoly Chukanov (1954–2021), Soviet cyclist
Andrea Chukanov (born 1995), Russian football player
Laura Chukanov (born 1986), Bulgarian-American pageant titleholder
Olga Khrzhanovskaya (born Chukanova in 1980), Russian volleyball player
Vyacheslav Chukanov (born 1952), Soviet equestrian 

Russian-language surnames